Yoo Dae-soon (Korean: 유대순; born March 4, 1965) is a South Korean former footballer who played as a goalkeeper.

He started his professional career at Yukong Elephants in 1989.

He was winner of K League Best XI in 1990 K League.

References

External links 
 
 

1965 births
Living people
Association football midfielders
Jeju United FC players
South Korean footballers
Korea University alumni
Place of birth missing (living people)
South Korea international footballers